Sistema di Controllo della Marcia del Treno (SCMT) is a discontinuous train cab signalling system used in  Italy. It shares many features with the Ripetizione Segnali (RS) system, the two systems co-existing and working together.  The main purpose of SCMT is to control the respect of the speed limit imposed by the signal aspect and the line condition.

SCMT is divided in two parts:
SSB: Sottosistema di bordo ("Onboard Subsystem")
SST: Sottosistema di terra ("Ground Subsystem")

Working principles 

SCMT is based upon an array of transponders called "Punto informativo" (PI) placed on the tracks near signals, reduced speed zones, and other important points along the line.  The PIs form the SST.  When a train passes over a PI, a set of "antennas" mounted in front of the first bogie energize it through induction. The PI then passes information about the aspect of the next signal through the antennas to the SSB.

If the system is supported by RS, and if the signal shows a restrictive aspect (anything different from Green) it has to be acknowledged by the train driver by pressing a button, else the system just gives indication of the signal on its display.

The system then elaborates a "braking curve" (curva di frenatura), that indicates the speed the train has to respect during the approach to the signal, until the "target speed" is reached. Failure of either acknowledging signal aspect or keeping the speed under the imposed braking curve/target speed causes the SSB to command emergency braking, which lasts until the speed gets below the limit.

The SSB takes several variables into account, especially when computing the braking curve, such as: percentage of brake weight (Massa frenata, it measures the overall brake efficiency), maximum speed limit allowed by rolling stock, train length, steep gradient, and signal aspect.

As said before, SCMT is a discontinuous system; this means that it is not aware of next signals' aspect changes unless it passes upon the relative PIs.
E.g.: if the SSB gets informed by a PI that the approaching signal is "Yellow", it then automatically assumes that the next signal is going to be "Red" and elaborates a braking curve accordingly. But if meanwhile the signal becomes "Green", the SSB does not get aware of it, and it assumes that it is red until the train passes the next PI.
This does not apply if the Ripetizione Segnali (RS) is available (only when the train is running on a BAcc block type line).
In this case the two system work together, and since RS is a continuous system, the SSB is aware of aspect changes, while still appropriately elaborating the maximum speed the train can run.

SCMT has some benefits, in respect of the RS alone: 
 is usable on any block type (Italy has different types of block systems in use, and RS is only usable on Automatic Block);
 constantly checks the maximum allowed speed (RS only on the 9 codes version);

However, it has some disadvantages:
 Frequent delays due to the increased rate of emergency brakes intervention, and for the speed limits imposed which stay even if the signals' aspect changes, as said above (especially in case of signal at danger which becomes green);
 Increased stress for the wheels and braking system because of more frequent emergency braking.
 When received on a buffer stop track, in the last 200 m the SSB imposes a speed of 5 km/h; other than the delay this may cause, on certain types of coaches below this speed doors can be opened, thus introducing safety issues.

To partially solve the first two points, the "V-V-V" (stands for Verde-Verde-Verde) has been introduced. In practice, the distant, protection and departure signals of a station may be encountered by trains showing a green aspect (if some conditions are met), even if the train is scheduled to stop there, and thus is not subjected to speed restrictions imposed by the system.

Description of the SSB 

Buttons:

SCMT: manually activates or deactivates the SCMT function (usually it activates itself automatically as soon as any PI is passed).
MAN (manovra): sets the SSB on shunting mode.
RSC (ripetizione segnali continua): activates the RS (ripetizione segnali) system.
SR (supero rosso): sets the SSB on "Train Trip" mode, used to pass Red signals when needed.
PRE (prericonoscimento): lights when the train is approaching a "Proceed Slow" signal, if the driver does not press it 12 seconds before receiving an "AC" code (which is received after passing the signal) emergency brakes are applied.
RIC (riconoscimento): lights when the train is approaching a restrictive aspect signal, if not pressed in 3 seconds, emergency brakes are applied.
RF (riarmo freno): used to release brakes when the SSB commands emergency brakes.

RIC and PRE keys are used only when RS is also active.

The following table shows the meaning of the signal codes icons used on the display and the target speed the train has to reach according to the braking curve/signal aspect-code. 

 *Depending on brake efficiency, maximum speed allowed by line and train vehicles.  
These speed/signal code values are the same used on Ripetizione segnali.

See also 

Train protection systems
Cab signalling systems
Ripetizione Segnali

References 
Italian website "Segnali FS" section about Sistema Controllo Marcia Treno

External links 
Norms about V-V-V

Train protection systems
Railway signalling in Italy